There are several entities referred to as the Swedish Institute:
 Swedish Institute, a government agency in Sweden

Swedish Institutes abroad
 Swedish Institute at Athens, an institute for archaeological research
 Swedish Institute at Rome, an institute for archaeological research
 American Swedish Institute
 Swedish Institute Alexandria

Other Swedish Institutes
 Swedish Institute of Computer Science
 Swedish Institute for International Affairs
 Swedish Institute for Language and Folklore
 Swedish Institute of Space Physics
 Swedish Institute College of Health Sciences